Basiphyllaea is a genus of orchids (family Orchidaceae), known as Carter's orchid or crab orchids. They are native to Florida and the West Indies. At the present time (May 2014), 7 species are recognized:

Basiphyllaea carabiaiana (L.O.Williams) Sosa & M.A.Díaz - Cuba
Basiphyllaea corallicola (Small) Ames - Florida, Bahamas, Cuba, Hispaniola, Puerto Rico
Basiphyllaea hamiltoniana Ackerman & Whitten - Jamaica
Basiphyllaea hoffmannii M.A.Díaz & Llamacho - Cuba
Basiphyllaea sarcophylla (Rchb.f.) Schltr.  - Cuba
Basiphyllaea volubilis (M.A.Díaz) Sosa & M.A.Díaz - Cuba
Basiphyllaea wrightii (Acuña) Nir - Cuba

References

External links
USDA plants profile, Basiphyllaea corallicola (Small) Ames,  Carter's orchid 
IOSPE orchid photos, Basiphyllaea wrightii
Florida Natural Areas Inventory, Carter's Orchid, Basiphyllaea corallicola
Institute for Regional Conservation, Floristic Inventory of South Florida Online, Basiphyllaea corallicola (Small) Ames,  Carter's orchid 

Bletiinae
Epidendreae genera